Mira Gojak is an Australian artist who was born in Adelaide in 1963 and now works in Melbourne. Her sculptures are like linear drawings in space, tracing the forces of gravity and suspension that we can feel. They create a sense of inside and outside space. Gojak is also known for her drawings. She has been awarded several times and has exhibited widely in Australia as well as Hong Kong.

Biography and education 

In Adelaide, Gojak's immigrant parents were active in the Catholic Slovenian and Croatian community. Mira has said that she felt she grew up in two different cultural and social worlds. Her mother wanted her to be a doctor, and Mira achieved First Class Honours and a Bachelor of Science in Zoology and animal behaviour Psychology, but Mira found during practical work that she was not happy in the world of zoology. She began to think that art would give her freedom so she went to Melbourne to study Art.

In 1989 she finished an advanced Certificate in Art and Design at Prahran TAFE, Melbourne. In 1990 she matriculated at the Victorian College of the Art, Melbourne where she graduated in 1992 with a Bachelor of Fine Arts (Painting). From 2014 she began work on a PhD at Monash University in Caufield, Victoria Her skills have been recognized by grants, prizes and residencies. In 2004 she received an Arts Victoria Art Development Grant for $10,000. From 2004 to 2006 Mira was a studio Artist and the Gertrude Street Contemporary Art Spaces in Melbourne. In 2011 She received an Arts Victoria Grant for $12,500 and in 2014 received another Grant for an exhibition as a Studio Artist at Gertrude Street Contemporary Art Spaces.

In 2005 she won the Maddock's Art Prize, from the Australia Council for the Arts. This prize is granted every two years go emerging artists, and is sponsored by the Maddock law firm. 

In 2012 her work was included in 101 Contemporary Australian Artists, published by the National Gallery of Victoria.

In 2014 Mira spent several months in Barcelona where she photographed the sky enclosed by her studio window and crisscrossed with airplane vapour trails. The photographs became the seeds for the series of blue yarn works she exhibited in 2016.

Works 
Her sculptures, which often include colour, are like her drawings on paper that are only in black-and-white. Mira admits that if she finds herself tiring on one medium, she begins to work on the other. 

Her works are very linear in both drawing and sculpture. When asked what attributes of line were important, she replied:"Fluidity and movement, the ability to scramble fixed boundaries, by eradicating boundaries or making them permeable or resetting and clarifying the boundary itself."She has also used yarn and wound it to create a mass of line, suggesting a line of great distance, that is wrapped around parts of linear sculptures.

Images of her works shown in 2018 can be seen at https://buxtoncontemporary.com/exhibitions/the-garden-of-forking-paths-mira-gojak-and-takehito-koganezawa/

Exhibitions

Collections 
Art Gallery of New South Wales

References 

1963 births
Living people
Australian women artists